Korf may refer to:


Places
Korf, Amol, a village in Mazandaran Province, Iran
Korf, North Khorasan, a village in North Khorasan Province, Iran
Korf, Russia, a rural locality (a selo) in Kamchatka Krai, Russia
KORF, the ICAO airport code for Norfolk International Airport, Virginia, United States

People
Andrey Korf (1831–1893), Russian general
Anthony Korf (b. 1951), American composer
Bruce R. Korf, American medical geneticist
Fyodor Korf (1773–1823), Russian military officer
Mia Korf (b. 1965), American actress
Richard P. Korf (1925–2016), American mycologist
Tjeerd Korf (b. 1983), Dutch association football player

Other uses
Korfball, a ball sport, similar to netball and basketball

See also
Korfa Bay, Kamchatka Peninsula coast of the Bering Sea in Russia
Korff (disambiguation)
Karaf (disambiguation)